Neil David Mathur is a Professor in Materials Physics in the Department of Materials Science and Metallurgy at the University of Cambridge.

Education
Mathur received his PhD from the University of Cambridge in 1995 for research into heavy fermion systems.

Research
Mathur's area of research is magnetic and electronic oxides, with a concentration on crystalline oxides. He has been experimenting with thin films (epitaxial films) and exploring applications for use in interfacing and imaging. He is the co-author of Mesoscopic texture in manganites with Peter Littlewood and Nanotechnology: The Third Way.

References 

British materials scientists
British science writers
Academics of the University of Cambridge
Year of birth missing (living people)
Living people
Alumni of Churchill College, Cambridge
Fellows of the American Physical Society